Vanda flabellata is a species of epiphytic orchid native to the Chinese province Yunnan, Laos, Vietnam and Thailand. It was erroneously reported to occur in Myanmar.

References

External links 

flabellata
Orchids of Thailand
Orchids of Laos
Orchids of Yunnan